The fifth season of American Ninja Warrior premiered on G4 on June 30, 2013, with subsequent shows airing on both G4 and NBC.  Host Matt Iseman returned for his fifth season, while newcomers Akbar Gbaja-Biamila and Jenn Brown replaced skier Jonny Moseley and Angela Sun. Similar to previous seasons, the winner receives $500,000 and the coveted title, "American Ninja Warrior".  This also marks the second season Mount Midoriyama was held on U.S. soil.

Cities
In addition to the four cities (Venice Beach, Baltimore, Miami, and Denver), the national finals were once again held in Las Vegas, Nevada.

Obstacles

City Qualifying & Finals

National Finals

City Qualifying
Tryouts for the fifth season of American Ninja Warrior commenced in February 2013 and took place in the following cities to determine the 100 competitors to compete participate in the qualifying rounds: Venice Beach, CA, Baltimore, MD, Miami, FL, and Denver, CO. The last of the qualifying rounds concluded in May 2013. The top 30 competitors that went the farthest the fastest would move on to the finals rounds.

Venice Beach Qualifying

Baltimore Qualifying

Miami Qualifying

Denver Qualifying

Qualifying Leaderboard

City Finals
The 30 competitors from qualifying in each city tackled an extended course, featuring four new additional obstacles like the Salmon Ladder and Spider Climb. The top 15 competitors that went the farthest the fastest would move on to the national finals in Las Vegas.

Venice Beach Finals

Baltimore Finals

Miami Finals

Denver Finals

Finals Leaderboard

Notable achievements
No one defeated Stage 3, but Brian Arnold fell on the last obstacle, the Flying Bar, making him the farthest-going American on the Mount Midoriyama course since Kane Kosugi reached the final stage on SASUKE 8. He also made it farther than any competitor in American Ninja Warrior history, surpassing Brent Steffensen, who failed on the Hang Climb in Stage 3 the previous season, which remained a record until Geoff Britten and Isaac Caldiero both completed Stage 3 in Season 7.

Notable competitors
 Tennessee Titans safety Jordan Babineaux
 Personal trainer/former American Gladiator "Venom" Beth Horn
 World champion freerunner Tim "Livewire" Shieff
 Harlem Globetrotter Bull Bullard
 "Artix" (Adam Bohn) from the video game studio Artix Entertainment
 Olympic gold medalist runners Dee Dee Trotter and Lauryn Williams
 Olympic silver medalist heptathlon athlete Hyleas Fountain
 Olympic silver medalist gymnast Terin Humphrey
 Former professional snowboarder Graham Watanabe
 Professional MMA fighter Jason Soares
 Professional UFC MMA fighter and The Ultimate Fighter season 14 winner John Dodson
 Former NFL player Shawne Merriman

Women's success
This was the first season where women attempted the Warped Wall (obstacle #6) of a course. Nika Muckelroy made it to the Warped Wall in the Denver qualifying course. Jessie Graff fell in the Flying Nunchucks (obstacle #5) during Venice qualifying but advanced in 30th position and reached the Warped Wall of the Venice finals. Both were unable to get up the wall in the 3 attempts given.

Mount Midoriyama
 The competitor cleared that stage.  The competitor is female.  The competitor ran out of time on the obstacle. The competitor was chosen as wildcard.

Stage 1

Stage 1 featured three new obstacles, the Timbers, the Giant Cycle, and the Rope Glider.

Leaderboard

Stage 2

Stage 2 featured one new obstacle, the Hang Slider.

Leaderboard

Stage 3

Ratings

References

American Ninja Warrior
2013 American television seasons